Professor David Dyzenhaus  is a South African-born, Canadian jurist who is currently Professor of Law and Philosophy at the University of Toronto, holding the Albert Abel Chair of Law.

Early life
Born in Johannesburg, Republic of South Africa, Dyzenhaus was educated at the University of the Witwatersrand, where he studied for his Bachelor of Arts and Bachelor of Laws degrees. He attained a Doctor of Philosophy degree from the University of Oxford.

Dyzenhaus also served in the South African Defence Force from 1980 to 1982.

References

Academic staff of the University of Toronto Faculty of Law
Fellows of the Royal Society of Canada
Living people
Year of birth missing (living people)
South African Army personnel